Edward Francis Charlton,  (31 October 1929 – 8 November 2004) was an Australian professional snooker and English billiards player. He remains the only player to have been world championship runner-up in both snooker and billiards without winning either title. He later became a successful marketer of sporting goods launching a popular brand of billiard room equipment bearing his name.

Early life
Charlton was born in Newcastle, New South Wales, Australia and came from a sporting family. His grandfather ran a billiards club in Swansea, New South Wales, and young Eddie began playing cue sports when he was nine years old. At the age of eleven, he defeated fellow Australian Walter Lindrum in a wartime snooker exhibition match, and he made his first century break when he was seventeen.

He was involved in numerous other sports during his youth: he was a first-grade footballer and played in the Australian First Division Football (soccer) for ten years; he was a champion surfer, and played state-level rugby and competitive cricket; he also excelled in speed roller skating, rowing, boxing and tennis. In 1956, he was chosen to carry the Olympic torch on part of its journey to the Melbourne Games.

Charlton worked as a coal miner until the age of 31. After winning four amateur snooker titles, he decided to turn professional in 1963 on the advice of Fred Davis. His brother Jim was also a professional snooker player but never joined the world ranks.

Career
Charlton became a professional player in 1963 at the age of 34, and won his first Australian Professional Championship the following season. For the next ten years he won the title annually, and made at least the semi-finals in every subsequent meeting through its last edition in 1988. He unsuccessfully challenged Rex Williams for the World Billiards Championship title in 1974 and 1976. His third appearance was in 1984 when he lost by a handful of points to Mark Wildman. Four years later, he lost to two-time champion Norman Dagley in his last World Billiards final.

Charlton was the most successful Australian snooker player until the emergence of Neil Robertson. From the first year of the snooker world rankings in 1976/77, he was ranked number three in the world for the next five consecutive seasons although he never won a ranking tournament (because, in the early years, only the Snooker World Championship counted).

Charlton, who was known for his focused and dogged performances, challenged for the World Championship in 1968, and was the runner-up in the final of the World Championship in 1973 and 1975, losing the 1975 world final by just one frame (30–31) to Ray Reardon. However, his 1972, 1973, and 1980 victories in the BBC's Pot Black competition, with its one-frame-per-match format, gave him a high profile with television audiences. He also recorded the first century break (110) on Pot Black.

Charlton was known for playing with a very straight cue action and rarely hitting the ball with any .

Although he did not reach the final stages of the World Championship in his later career, Charlton continued to perform at a competitive level. His last major achievement was his 10–9 first round win over Cliff Thorburn at the 1989 World Championship. He qualified for the 1990 and 1991 World Championships but lost in the first round on both occasions. Charlton's final appearance at the Crucible came in 1992 where he was defeated 10–0 by defending champion John Parrott in the first round, the only recorded  in the history of the World Championship until 2019, when Shaun Murphy defeated Luo Honghao 10–0.

Personal life
Always active in the organisation and promotion of the game, Charlton was appointed a Member of the Order of Australia (AM) in 1980. He formed the Australian Professional Players Association and was responsible for bringing many of the top players to play in Australia. He released a 30-minute beginners' instructional video, Eddie Charlton's Snooker, Pool & Trick Shots, in PAL VHS format. In 1993 he was inducted into the Sport Australia Hall of Fame. He stopped competing in 1995 and died in Palmerston North, New Zealand on 8 November 2004 following an operation.

Performance and rankings timeline

Career finals

Ranking finals: 1

Non-ranking finals: 31 (22 titles)
{|
| valign=top width=40% align=left |

Team finals: 2 (1 title)

References

1929 births
2004 deaths
Australian snooker players
Australian players of English billiards
Members of the Order of Australia
People from Newcastle, New South Wales
Trick shot artists
Australian Freemasons
Sport Australia Hall of Fame inductees
Sportsmen from New South Wales